Alberta Provincial Highway No. 734, commonly referred to as Highway 734, is a highway in western Alberta, Canada that travels through the forested foothills of the Rocky Mountains. It used to be part of Forestry Trunk Road and is still colloquially referred to as such.

It is preceded by the remaining central segment of Forestry Trunk Road, Highway 734 begins south of the Red Deer River to the southwest of Sundre, and is succeeded by Highway 40, which also used to be part of Forestry Trunk Road. The highway ends north of the Pembina River.

Forestry Trunk Road was a north-south resource road that ran from the Crowsnest Highway (Highway 3) in southern Alberta to Highway 43 in northern Alberta. Over time, some segments of the road have been designated as parts of Highway 40 or Highway 734, while the northernmost segment between Highway 40 and Highway 43 is no longer named Forestry Trunk Road.

Two segments of Forestry Trunk Road remain – a southern segment from the Municipality of Crowsnest Pass to Highway 541 to the southwest of Longview, and a short central segment from Highway 579 west of Cremona to south of the Red Deer River. The southern segment is preceded and succeeded by the first and second segments of Highway 40 respectively, while the central segment is preceded by the third segment of Highway 40 and succeeded by Highway 734.

Route description 

Over its  length, the gravel road provides access to numerous public campgrounds, crosses the Oldman River, and intersects with Highway 532. It also passes near the Bob Creek Wildland Provincial Park, Livingstone Falls, and the Don Getty Wildland Provincial Park before ending at its intersection with Highway 541 and the second segment of Highway 40, which was part of Forestry Trunk Road before being designated a provincial highway.

Another former segment of Forestry Trunk Road, now the third segment of Highway 40, begins at Highway 1A to the west of Cochrane and ends  later at an intersection with Highway 579.

Over its course, the central segment of Forestry Trunk Road combined with Highway 734 provides access to Ram Falls Provincial Park and numerous campgrounds, and intersects Highway 579, Highway 584, Highway 591, Highway 752, and Highway 11 (David Thompson Highway) west of Nordegg. This stretch also crosses the Red Deer, James, Clearwater, Ram, North Saskatchewan, Blackstone, Brazeau, and Pembina rivers.

Major intersections 
Starting from the south end of Highway 40:

References 

734